Senior warrant officer (SWO) is a warrant officer rank in the Bangladesh Armed Forces, the Singapore Armed Forces and the South African National Defence Force.

Bangladesh
Army
Senior warrant officer
Bangladesh Army
Senior warrant officer is a junior-commissioned officer rank in the Bangladesh Army, falling between Master Warrant Officer and warrant officer.
Airforce
Senior warrant officer
Bangladesh Air Force
Senior warrant officer is the junior-commissioned officer rank in the Bangladesh Air Force, falling between Master warrant officer and Warrant officer.

Singapore

It is the second highest warrant officer rank, ranking below Chief Warrant Officer.

The division and formation regimental sergeant majors are mostly Senior Warrant Officers. Many Senior Warrant Officers remain in the SAFWOS Leadership School to train and groom both junior and senior warrant officers to be dynamic warrant officers of the Singapore Armed Forces. Roles undertaken by Senior Warrant Officers include Formation Sergeant Majors, Division Sergeant Majors and Chief Master Trainers.

South Africa

In 2008 the warrant officer ranks of the South African National Defence Force were expanded and the rank of senior warrant officer was created.

References

See also
 Singapore Armed Forces ranks
 Specialist (Singapore)

Military ranks of Singapore
Warrant officers